Glipa sanfilippoi is a species of beetle in the genus Glipa. It was described in 1998.

References

sanfilippoi
Beetles described in 1998